Indonesia participated in the 1974 Asian Games held in Tehran, Iran from 1 to 16 September 1974. Athletes from Indonesia won overall 11 medals, including three gold, and finished ninth in a medal table.

Medal summary

Medal table

Medalists

References

Nations at the 1974 Asian Games
1974
Asian Games